Khalabat Township (also known as Khalabat, Khalabut, Tarbela Colony, or Tarbela Township) is one of the 30 union councils of Haripur District in the Khyber Pukhtoonkhwa of Pakistan. Covering a hilly plain area, the township comprises four sectors and two Union Councils: Tarbela Union Council has sector 1 and 2, and Khalabat Union Council has sector 3 and 4.

Location
It is located on the way from Haripur to Tarbela Lake (see external image).

The GPO Located at:

General Post Office. Sector 01, Khalabat Township, Postcode:22800, Haripur, Khyber Pakhtunkhwa.

Civil Hospital Located at:

Utman Chowk, Sector#04

References

Union councils of Haripur District
Haripur District